The U.S. Travelling Expenses Publication Activities Act of May 11, 1922, allowed Forest Service employees to be reimbursed for long-distance traveling related to public awareness campaigns and required long distance forestry research projects.

See also 
 67th United States Congress

1922 in law
1922 in the United States
United States federal environmental legislation